Ruská Nová Ves is a village and municipality in Prešov District in the Prešov Region of eastern Slovakia.

History
In historical records the village was first mentioned in 1423.

Geography
The municipality lies at an elevation of 430 metres (1,410 ft) and covers an area of 12.574 km² (4.855 mi²). It has a population of about 1036 people.

External links
statistics.sk/mosmis/ via the Wayback Machine.

Villages and municipalities in Prešov District
Šariš